Hopelessly Lost is a 1973 Soviet adventure comedy directed by Georgiy Daneliya based on Mark Twain's 1884 novel Adventures of Huckleberry Finn. Cinematography by Vadim Yusov. It was entered into the 1974 Cannes Film Festival.

Cast
 Roman Madyanov as Huck
 Vladimir Basov as Huck's father
 Feliks Imokuede as Jim
 Vladimir Ivashov as Colonel Sherborne
 Vakhtang Kikabidze as Duke
 Yevgeny Leonov as King
 Irina Popova
 Ivan Ryzhov
 Natalya Sayko
 Irina Skobtseva
 Veriko Verulashvili

See also
List of films featuring slavery

References

External links

1973 films
Soviet adventure comedy films
Russian adventure comedy films
1970s adventure comedy films
Mosfilm films
Films directed by Georgiy Daneliya
Films based on Adventures of Huckleberry Finn
1970s Russian-language films
1973 comedy films